Best Days (Greatest & Live) is a compilation album by Danish electronic rock band Carpark North. It was released on 1 November 2010 through Copenhagen Records.

The first CD contains songs from the band's three studio albums, Carpark North (2003), All Things to All People (2005), and Grateful (2008). In addition, there are two new tracks "Burn It" and "Everything Starts Again", which were released as singles in 2010 and 2011.

The second CD is a live album recorded during "Grøn Koncert" in the summer of 2010. It also includes four tracks from the band's first internationally released album, Lost (2010).

Track listing

Charts

References

Carpark North albums
2010 compilation albums